Elections to a Legislative Assembly were held for the first and only time in Portuguese Mozambique in March 1973.

Background
On 2 May 1972 the Portuguese National Assembly passed the Organic Law for the Overseas Territories, which provided for greater autonomy for overseas territories. Mozambique was to have a 50-member Legislative Assembly, of which 20 would be elected. The remainder would be nominated by public services, religious groups and business groups.

Candidates were required to be Portuguese citizens who had lived in Mozambique for more than three years and be able to read and write Portuguese. Voters were required to be literate. As the Portuguese constitution banned political parties at the time, the majority of candidates were put forward by the ruling People's National Action movement, although some civic associations were allowed to nominate candidates.

Results
Out of a total population of 7,376,000, only 109,171 people registered to vote. Of these, 100,542 voted, giving a voter turnout of 92.1%. Of all the Portuguese colonies holding Legislative Assembly elections, Mozambique was the only one to have a non-white majority of its membership, with 26 of the 50 members being non-white. The 26 non-white members included 18 Africans, three coloureds, three Indians, one Goan and one Chinese.

References

1973 in Portuguese Mozambique
1973 elections in Africa
1973
Non-partisan elections